Rajinder Singh Rawat (born 30 January 1964) is an Indian field hockey player. He competed in the men's tournament at the 1988 Summer Olympics.

References

External links
 

1964 births
Living people
Indian male field hockey players
Field hockey players from Uttarakhand
Olympic field hockey players of India
Field hockey players at the 1988 Summer Olympics
Asian Games medalists in field hockey
Asian Games bronze medalists for India
Medalists at the 1986 Asian Games
Field hockey players at the 1986 Asian Games